
Gmina Niegowa is a rural gmina (administrative district) in Myszków County, Silesian Voivodeship, in southern Poland.

Villages
Gmina Niegowa contains the villages and settlements of Antolka, Bliżyce, Bobolice, Brzeziny, Dąbrowno, Gorzków Nowy, Gorzków Stary, Ludwinów, Łutowiec, Mirów, Moczydło, Mzurów, Niegowa, Niegówka, Ogorzelnik, Postaszowice, Sokolniki, Tomiszowice, Trzebniów and Zagórze.

Neighbouring gminas
Gmina Niegowa is bordered by the gminas of Irządze, Janów, Kroczyce, Lelów, Włodowice and Żarki.

References

Niegowa
Myszków County